Köcəkli (also, Göcəkli, Gochakli, Kechagly, and Kechakli) is a village and municipality in the Masally Rayon of Azerbaijan.  It has a population of 1,528.

References 

Populated places in Masally District